Kee Business College is the former name of a for-profit college with branches in Chesapeake and Newport News, Virginia.  Kee became a part of the Everest College system of colleges. Everest Institute offers classes in Business Accounting, Homeland Security, Massage Therapy, Medical Assisting, Medical Insurance Billing & Coding, Medical Administrative Assisting and Dental Assisting.

The college was founded in Newport News in 1941 as the College of Hampton Roads, and in 1982 it became Kee Business College.  Between 1986 and 1996, the school's name was changed to National Education Center - Kee Business College Campus, returning to Kee Business College in 1996.  In 1999, the Chesapeake campus was opened.  In 2007 the name was changed again to Everest Institute.

The schools are owned by Corinthian Colleges.

References

External links
 

For-profit universities and colleges in the United States
Educational institutions established in 1941
Corinthian Colleges
1941 establishments in Virginia